Guatraché Department is a department of Argentina in La Pampa Province.  The capital of the department is the city of Guatraché.

References

Departments of La Pampa Province